Børsen (Danish for "the Exchange"), also known as Børsbygningen ("The (Stock) Exchange building" in English), is a 17th-century stock exchange in the center of Copenhagen. The historic building is situated next to Christiansborg Palace, the seat of the Danish Parliament, on the island of Slotsholmen. Børsen, a popular tourist attraction, is most noted for its distinctive spire, shaped as the tails of four dragons twined together, reaching a height of 56 metres.

Built under the reign of Christian IV in 1619–1640, the building is considered a leading example of the Dutch Renaissance style in Denmark. It is a protected building for conservation purposes.

History

Børsen was planned by Christian IV as part of his plan to strengthen Copenhagen's role as a centre for trade and commerce in Northern Europe. A site on the north side of the embankment which connected Copenhagen to the new market town Christianshavn, which was planned on reclaimed land off the coast of Amager. The king charged Lorenz van Steenwinckel with the design of the new building, but Steenwinckel died shortly thereafter. The assignment was then passed on to his brother, Hans van Steenwinckel.

The site first had to be prepared since the embankment had not yet stabilized. Construction of the building began in 1620 and was largely completed in 1624 with the exception of the spire (installed in 1625) and details of the east gable (completed in 1640). The building contained 40 trading offices at the ground floor and one large room at the upper floor. The building was in use as a marketplace during the late 1620s.

In 1647, Christian IV sold the building to the merchant Jacob Madsen for 50,000 Danish rigsdaler. Frederick III later reacquired the building from Madsen's widow.

The building was restored by Nicolai Eigtved in 1745.

19th and 20th centuries
The interior of the building was renovated in 1855. In 1857, Frederick VII sold the building to Grosserer-Societetet for 70,000 rigsdaler.

The building housed the Danish stock-market until 1974. In 1918, unemployed anarchists attacked Børsen, an attack that went to the Danish history books as "stormen på Børsen" (The Storm of the Stock Exchange).

Current use
The building now serves as headquarters of the Danish Chamber of Commerce (Dansk Erhverv).

Cultural references
 Børsen is the location where Holm-Hansen hands the Bedford Diamonds over to an Arabian sheik in the 1974 Olsen-banden film The Last Exploits of the Olsen Gang.

Gallery

See also 
 Copenhagen Stock Exchange
 Slotsholmsgade

Notes 

Buildings and structures in Copenhagen
Tourist attractions in Copenhagen
Buildings and structures completed in 1640
1640 establishments in Denmark
Brick buildings and structures
Renaissance architecture in Copenhagen
Financial history of Denmark
Stock exchange buildings